Società Sportiva Dilettantistica Brindisi Football Club is an Italian association football club located in Brindisi, in the region of Apulia in southern Italy.

History 
Brindisi was founded in 1912 as F.B. Brindisi 1912 and refounded in 1990 and then refounded in 2004 and then refounded in 2011 and then refounded in 2015 with the current name.

Brindisi Calcio 
The team played in Serie C2 in the 2003–04 season. At the end of the year, the team went bankrupt and the new club was placed in Eccellenza.

F.B. Brindisi 1912  
In the 2004–05 season of Eccellenza Apulia, Brindisi placed second, qualifying for the national playoffs. The team won its two rounds in the playoffs, thus winning promotion to Serie D.

For the next 4 season, the team played in Serie D. In the 2008–09 season, Brindisi clinched first place in Girone H, thus gaining direct promotion to Lega Pro Seconda Divisione.

In summer 2011, it did not appeal against the exclusion of Covisoc.

S.S.D. Città di Brindisi 
The club is restarted in Serie D with the new denomination of Società Sportiva Dilettantistica Città di Brindisi. It went bankrupt in only four years.

New Brindisi 
Real Paradiso Brindisi in Prima Categoria created tue new Brindisi in 2015.

Colors and badge 
Its colors are white and blue.

Honours
Coppa Italia Serie C
Winners: 2002–03

References

External links 
 Official homepage

Sport in Brindisi
Football clubs in Apulia
Association football clubs established in 1912
Serie B clubs
Serie C clubs
1912 establishments in Italy
Coppa Italia Serie C winning clubs
Serie D clubs
1990 establishments in Italy
2004 establishments in Italy
2011 establishments in Italy
2015 establishments in Italy